Difficult Woman is the ninth studio album by Australian soul and R&B singer Renée Geyer. The album was released in September 1994 and peaked at number 91 on the ARIA Charts.

In a 2009 with ABC, Geyer said of Paul Kelly, "I think some of the best things that he's ever written have been when he's written for somebody else. He's got an uncanny way of putting things that a billion people have said a million times, but he has a way of making it sound like it's the first time you've heard it. And that's why he's such a great writer." adding the title track is "about a complicated woman and that's it."

Track listing 
 "Close" (Paul Kelly) – 4:12
 "Careless"  (featuring Paul Kelly)  (Kelly) – 3:43
 "Difficult Woman"  (Kelly) – 4:26
 "God Only Knows" (Brian Wilson, Tony Asher) – 2:03
 "Foggy Highway" (Kelly) – 3:29
 "Summer, Winter, Spring and Fall"  (featuring Dori Caymmi)  (Kelly, Renée Geyer) – 5:32
 "Just the Thought of You" (Harry Brus, Matt Sherrod, Geyer) – 4:54
 "Sweet Guy" (Kelly) – 4:35
 "Real" (John Capek, Michael Rothenberg, Geyer) – 5:18
 "He Was Too Good to Me" (Richard Rodgers, Lorenz Hart) – 3:09 
 Trouble" (John Clifforth, Geyer) – 3:10

Charts

Release history

References 

1994 albums
Renée Geyer albums
Jazz albums by Australian artists